US Post Office-Norwich is a historic post office building located at Norwich in Chenango County, New York, United States. It was built in 1932–1933, and is one of a number of post offices in New York State built by the Office of the Supervising Architect of the Treasury Department.  It was designed by architect George Ketcham of Syracuse.  It is a one-story brick building ornamented with elaborate cast stone details in the Colonial Revival style. It is located within the Chenango County Courthouse District.

It was listed on the National Register of Historic Places in 1989.

See also
National Register of Historic Places listings in Chenango County, New York

References

Norwich
Government buildings completed in 1933
Colonial Revival architecture in New York (state)
Buildings and structures in Chenango County, New York
National Register of Historic Places in Chenango County, New York